James Martin (25 February 1851 – 22 October 1930) was an Australian cricketer. He played one first-class match for Tasmania in 1872.

See also
 List of Tasmanian representative cricketers

References

External links
 

1851 births
1930 deaths
Australian cricketers
Tasmania cricketers
Cricketers from Launceston, Tasmania